El Aaiun egdat is the third album of Sahrawi singer Mariem Hassan. The album reached Number 1 on the World Music Charts Europe (WMCE) on June and July 2012. It was also elected as the best album presented at the 2012 edition of the World Village Festival in Helsinki, Finland.

Track listing

References 

2012 albums
Mariem Hassan albums
Arabic-language albums